The Battle of Lanfeng, in the Second Sino-Japanese War, was part of the larger campaign for Northern and Eastern Henan (February 7 – June 10, 1938) and took place at the same time as the Battle of Xuzhou (Late December – Early June 1938) was occurring.

It involved a Chinese counterattack at Lanfeng by elements of the 1st War Area against the positions held by the Japanese 14th Division.  The 14th Division was the vanguard of the Japanese First Army (North China Area Army) and numbered 20,000 men with tanks. It was the first action of the Chinese 200th Division, the first mechanized division in the Chinese Army.

In the assault, the 200th Division of the National Revolutionary Army, located to the west of the line of contact, overran the flanks of Kenji Doihara's 14th Division, successfully encircling 7,000 men of the division in the county of Lanfeng. The battle resulted in a Japanese defeat, forestalling the Japanese capture of the northern section of the Longhai railway. The Chinese victory, which The New York Times described as a second Taierzhuang, resulted in the near destruction of the 14th Division.

Simultaneously, Japanese forces undertook a successful offensive operation that captured the city of Kweiteh southeast of Lanfeng.

Order of Battle of Lanfeng 
See the Order of Battle of the Battle of Lanfeng

References

Sources
Hsu Long-hsuen and Chang Ming-kai, History of The Sino-Japanese War (1937–1945) 2nd Ed., 1971. Translated by Wen Ha-hsiung, Chung Wu Publishing; 33, 140th Lane, Tung-hwa Street, Taipei, Taiwan Republic of China, page 230–235, Map. 9-2

Lanfeng
Lanfeng
1938 in China
1938 in Japan
Military history of Henan
May 1938 events